Nationalliga B (German),  may refer to:
Nationalliga B was the name of second highest ice hockey league
Nationalliga B ?-2003, football league

See also
Nationalliga A (disambiguation)